Gerold Siedler (born August 16, 1933) is a German physical oceanographer. He is professor emeritus at the Christian-Albrechts University of Kiel and at the GEOMAR Helmholtz Centre for Ocean Research Kiel.

Early life 

Gerold Siedler was born in Olmütz (Czech: Olomouc), then Czechoslovakia. His movements during his childhood were  influenced by the turmoil of World War II, until his family was finally reunited in 1946 in Plön, Schleswig-Holstein, West Germany. He attended schools in Reichenberg (now Liberec) and Prague during the war, and Weimar after.

Professional positions and research 

In 1953 Gerold Siedler started his studies in Physics, Mathematics and Geophysics at the Christian-Albrechts University of Kiel. He earned a doctoral degree in Physics in 1960 working with the applied physicist . His dissertation in the field of acoustics led him to develop a vocoder and explore speech discrimination in a reduced speech signal environment. Under the mentorship of Günter Dietrich, he subsequently started his career as a physical oceanographer at the Institute of Marine Science (German: Institut für Meereskunde Kiel, now GEOMAR Helmholtz Centre for Ocean Research Kiel), where he remained until retirement in 1998. He obtained his habilitation in oceanography and geophysics from the University of Kiel in 1966 for his work on the circulation and stratification at Bab-el-Mandeb, Red Sea.

He was appointed in 1969 as professor of physical oceanography at the same university. During his tenure at the Institut für Meereskunde and as professor of the University of Kiel, he held the following positions:

 Director of Marine Physics Department, 1969-1998 
 Director of the Institut für Meereskunde, 1976-1978
 Dean of the Faculty of Mathematics and Natural Sciences of the University of Kiel, 1991-1992
 Emeritus Professor, since 1998 

His work contributed in advancing knowledge on ocean circulation and climate, boundary currents, oceanic fronts, flow through straits, mixing processes, and internal waves. In addition, he was actively involved in the development of oceanographic instruments.

Siedler undertook  28 research expeditions, most of them as chief scientist. He spent  time on the German vessel RV Meteor II (1964), and helped in the design of its successor, the RV Meteor III (1986). He played a fundamental role in designing the World Ocean Circulation Experiment (WOCE) program including defining standards for oceanographic sampling, which were pivotal for the success of the program. At the culmination of the WOCE, he co-edited the first edition of the "Ocean Circulation and Climate: Observing and Modelling the Global Ocean" book published in 2001, and subsequently its second edition "Ocean Circulation and Climate: A 21st Century Perspective" in 2013.

Over the years, Siedler held several positions as visiting scientist in the USA, France, Spain and South Africa. Most notably, he collaborated with scientists at the Woods Hole Oceanographic Institution, the University of Hawaii, the University of Miami and NOAA/AOML, the Jet Propulsion Laboratory in Pasadena, Université Pierre et Marie Curie, IFREMER in Brest, and the University of Cape Town.

Teaching 

As a Privatdozent and subsequently a professor at the University of Kiel, Gerold Siedler taught since 1966. He additionally held appointments as visiting professor at Woods Hole Oceanographic Institution/Massachusetts Institute of Technology (USA), at the International Centre for Theoretical Physics (Trieste, Italy), the University of Hamburg (Germany), the Universidad de Las Palmas de Gran Canaria (Gran Canaria, Spain), Universidad de La Laguna (Tenerife, Spain), and the University of Concepción (Chile). He supervised the scholarly works of no less than 70 Diplom, Doctoral, and Habilitation students in Kiel.

Services to professional bodies

National appointments 
German Research Foundation:
 Commission for water research, 1968-1977
 Commission for oceanography, 1974-1995; Chair, 1986-1995
 German Scientific Committee on Oceanic Research, 1975-1995; Chair, 1980-1995 
 Committee for the German meteorological research aircraft, 1978
 Oceanography and Physics of the atmosphere, Elected referee, 1980-1988

German federal ministry for science and technology (now Bundesministerium für Bildung und Forschung):
 Committee for Research Vessels and Underwater Systems, 1969-1971
 Committee for Measurement Technology, 1970–1973
 Committee for Permanent Buoy Stations in the North and Baltic Seas, 1974–1975
 Commission for Marine Research and Ocean Technology, 1975–1978
 German-Brazilian bilateral research programs in ocean science and technology Coordinator, 1983-1989
 German World Ocean Circulation Experiment (WOCE) Committee Chair, 1986-1989

 
 Technical and scientific advisory board, 1976-1981

International appointments 

Scientific Committee on Oceanic Research (SCOR) of the International Council for Science (ICSU):
 Working Group 21 "Current meter intercomparison"  Member, 1966–1974
 Working Group 34 "Internal dynamics of the ocean"  Member, 1976–1982
 Working Group 43 "Oceanography related to the GARP Atlantic Tropical Experiment (GATE)", Chair, 1972–1978
 SCOR Vice-president, 1980–1983; President, 1983–1988, Past-President, 1988-1992 

International Association for the Physical Sciences of the Oceans (IAPSO) of the International Union of Geodesy and Geophysics (IUGG):
 Vice-president, 1975-1979 

Programme National d'Etude de la Dynamique du Climat (PNEDC), France:
 Scientific committee member, 1988–1992 

Scientific Steering Group of the World Ocean Circulation Experiment (WOCE):
 Member of the Executive, 1989-1993 

Woods Hole Oceanographic Institution, USA: 
 Visiting Committee Member, 1992 

European Commission, Brussels Mid-Term Evaluation Panel, Marine Science and Technology Program:
 Member, 1995

Awards 
 Dedicated special volume "New Views of the Atlantic: A Tribute to Gerold Siedler", Deep Sea Research Part II: Topical Studies in Oceanography, 1999.
 Alexander von Humboldt - Research Award 2004/2005, National Research Foundation, South Africa.

References

Sources 
 Biography at GEOMAR Helmholtz Centre for Ocean Research Kiel

External links 
 

Living people
1933 births
German oceanographers
Scientists from Olomouc